Anthony Fahden (born February 27, 1986) is an American rower. He competed in the Men's lightweight coxless four event at the 2012 Summer Olympics.

References

External links
 

1986 births
Living people
American male rowers
Olympic rowers of the United States
Rowers at the 2012 Summer Olympics
Rowers at the 2016 Summer Olympics
Sportspeople from Berkeley, California
World Rowing Championships medalists for the United States